Montour Wildlife Management Area at  is an Idaho wildlife management area in Gem County near Emmett along the Payette River. It was established in 1976 with Bureau of Reclamation funds after the construction of the Black Canyon Dam backed up water in the Montour area. The Bureau of Reclamation and the Idaho Department of Fish and Game entered a cooperative agreement to manage the WMA in 1983. 

The WMA is a complex of wetlands that support waterfowl and upland game. Raptors are commonly seen in the area, and game bird hunting, wildlife viewing, fishing, and camping are some of the activities available to visitors.

References

Protected areas established in 1976
Protected areas of Gem County, Idaho
Wildlife management areas of Idaho